Hypaedalea is a genus of moths in the family Sphingidae.

Species

Hypaedalea butleri Rothschild, 1894
Hypaedalea insignis Butler, 1877
Hypaedalea lobipennis Strand, 1913
Hypaedalea neglecta Carcasson, 1972

Macroglossini
Moth genera
Taxa named by Arthur Gardiner Butler